The 1911 All-Western college football team consists of American football players selected to the All-Western teams chosen by various selectors for the 1911 college football season.

All-Western selections

Ends
 Stanfield Wells, Michigan (AX, CEP, ECP-1, EWC, GWA, LGS, SFE, SJ, WE)
 Joseph Hoeffel, Wisconsin (EWC, LGS, SFE, WE)
 Paul Harold Tobin, Minnesota (AX, ECP-2, GWA)
 Knute Rockne, Notre Dame (SJ)
 Chauncey B. Oliver, Illinois (ECP-2)

Tackles
 Alfred L. Buser, Wisconsin (AX, CEP, ECP-1, EWC [guard], GWA, SFE)
 Frederick L. Conklin, Michigan (AX, ECP-2, EWC, GWA, LGS, WE)
 Charles M. Rademacher, Chicago (CEP, ECP-1, LGS, SFE, WE)
 Leonard Frank, Minnesota (ECP-2)

Guards
 Horace F. Scruby, Chicago (CEP, ECP-1, EWC, GWA, LGS, SFE, WE)
 Sylvester V. Shonka, Nebraska (AX, CEP, ECP-2, EWC [tackle], SFE, SJ [tackle], WE)
 Lucius A. Smith, Minnesota (ECP-1, LGS, SJ)
 Charles H. Belting, Illinois (AX, GWA)
 Charles J. Robinson, Minnesota (SJ)
 Paul Belting, Illinois (ECP-2)

Centers
 Willis "Fat" O'Brien, Iowa (AX, CEP, GWA, LGS, SFE, SJ)
 Clifford F. Morrell, Minnesota (ECP-1, EWC, WE)
 R. E. Branstad, Wisconsin (ECP-2)

Quarterbacks
 John "Keckie" Moll, Wisconsin (AX, CEP, ECP-2, EWC, GWA, LGS, SJ, WE)
 Thomas Andrew Gill, Indiana (SFE)
 Edmund Gillette, Wisconsin (ECP-1)

Halfbacks
 Reuben Martin Rosenwald, Minnesota (AX, CEP [fullback], ECP-1, GWA, LGS, SFE, SJ, WE)
 Clark Sauer, Chicago (AX [fullback], CEP, ECP-1, GWA [fullback], LGS, SFE, WE)
 James B. Craig, Michigan (AX, CEP, ECP-2, EWC, GWA)
 Owen A. Frank, Nebraska (EWC, SJ [tackle])
 Lewis C. Stevens, Minnesota (ECP-2, SJ)

Fullbacks 
 George C. Thomson, Michigan (ECP-1, EWC, SFE, WE)
 Ralph Capron, Minnesota (CEP [end], ECP-1 [end], LGS, SJ)
 Stanley R. Pierce, Chicago (ECP-2)

Key
Bold = consensus choice by a majority of the selectors

AX = G. W. Axelson

CEP = Chicago Evening Post

ECP = E. C. Patterson of Collier's Weekly

EWC = Edward W. Cochrane, sporting editor of Kansas City Journal

GWA = G. W. Axelson, sporting editor of Chicago Record-Herald

LGS = L. G. Sullivan, sporting editor of Chicago Daily News

SJ = Edgar L. Shave and John L. Johnson in the St. Paul Daily News

WE = Walter Eckersall

SFE = San Francisco Examiner

See also
1911 College Football All-America Team

References

All-Western team
All-Western college football teams